Jean Léon Maisonnave (14 October 1882 – 20 November 1913) was a French cyclist. He competed in the men's sprint event at the 1900 Summer Olympics.

References

External links
 

1882 births
1913 deaths
French male cyclists
Olympic cyclists of France
Cyclists at the 1900 Summer Olympics
Cyclists from Paris